The fifth competition weekend of the 2014–15 ISU Speed Skating World Cup was held in the Vikingskipet arena in Hamar, Norway, from Saturday, 31 January, until Sunday, 1 February 2015.

There were no world records set during the weekend, but Marina Zueva of Belarus set a national record as she finished second in the B division of the women's 3000 m on Sunday, and Elena Møller-Rigas of Denmark set new national junior records on both 1500 m and 3000 m.

Schedule
The detailed schedule of events:

All times are CET (UTC+1).

Medal summary

Men's events

 In mass start, race points are accumulated during the race. The skater with most race points is the winner.

Women's events

 In mass start, race points are accumulated during the race. The skater with most race points is the winner.

References

 
5
Isu World Cup, 2014-15, 5
Sport in Hamar